Polydesmia is a genus of fungi within the family Hyaloscyphaceae. The genus contains 7 species.

References

External links
Polydesmia at Index Fungorum

Hyaloscyphaceae
Leotiomycetes genera